The second Marlin-Romeo cabinet was the 8th cabinet of Sint Maarten. It was formed by a coalition of the political parties United Democrats (UD) and the St. Maarten Christian Party (SMCP).

The cabinet succeeded the first Marlin-Romeo cabinet following the 2018 general election, and was installed by Governor Eugene Holiday on 25 June 2018. The cabinet lost its majority on 9 September 2019 when Franklin Meyers, faction leader of the UD, left his party to become an independent Member of Parliament. On 22 September 2019, UD Members of Parliament Luc Mercelina and Chanel Brownbill followed suit, which led to the collapse of the second Marlin-Romeo cabinet.

Composition

References

Marlin-Romeo II
Marlin-Romeo II
Marlin-Romeo II